

Business
 Partner relationship management, in IT
 Person with reduced mobility, in transport
 Professional Risk Manager, a certification

Computer science
 Probabilistic relational model
 Probabilistic roadmap in robotics

Government and politics
 Bureau of Population, Refugees, and Migration, of US State Department
 Partido de la Revolución Mexicana (Party of the Mexican Revolution), later Institutional Revolutionary Party (Partido Revolucionario Institucional, PRI)
 Partido Revolucionario Moderno (Modern Revolutionary Party), Dominican Republic
 Partidul România Mare or Greater Romania Party, ultra-nationalist party
 Parti de Regroupement Mauritanien or Mauritanian Regroupment Party, a former party
 Parti Rakyat Malaysia, party in Malaysia
 Partido Republicano Mineiro or Mineiro Republican Party, Brazilian party 1888-1937
 Partido Revolucionário de Moçambique or Revolutionary Party of Mozambique, Mozambican rebel group 1974/76–1982
 People's Revolutionary Militia, former Grenada militia
 An alternative name for Al-Shabaab (militant group)
 Presidential Review Memorandum, US national security directives during Carter presidency

Technology
 Parallel reaction monitoring in mass spectrometry
 Precision runway monitor, Raytheon radar system